There are several uses of the 2.4 GHz band. Interference may occur between devices operating at 2.4 GHz. This article details the different users of the 2.4 GHz band, how they cause interference to other users and how they are prone to interference from other users.

Phone

Many of the cordless telephones and baby monitors in the United States and Canada use the 2.4 GHz frequency, the same frequency at which Wi-Fi standards 802.11b, 802.11g, 802.11n and 802.11ax operate.  This can cause a significant decrease in speed, or sometimes the total blocking of the Wi-Fi signal when a conversation on the phone takes place.  There are several ways to avoid this however, some simple, and some more complicated.
 Using wired phones, which do not transmit.
 Using cordless phones that do not use the 2.4 GHz band.
 Using the 5 GHz band.
DECT 6.0 (1.9 GHz), 5.8 GHz or 900 MHz phones, commonly available today, do not use the 2.4 GHz band and thus do not interfere.
VoIP/Wi-Fi phones share the Wi-Fi base stations and participate in the Wi-Fi contention protocols.
Several different Wi-Fi channels are available and it is possible to avoid the phone channels.
The last will sometimes not be successful, as numerous cordless phones use a feature called Digital Spread Spectrum.  This technology was designed to ward off eavesdroppers, but the phone will change channels at random, leaving no Wi-Fi channel safe from phone interference.

Bluetooth

Bluetooth devices intended for use in short-range personal area networks operate from 2.4 to 2.4835 GHz.  To reduce interference with other protocols that use the 2.45 GHz band, the Bluetooth protocol divides the band into 80 channels (numbered from 0 to 79, each 1 MHz wide) and changes channels up to 1600 times per second.  Newer Bluetooth versions also feature Adaptive Frequency Hopping which attempts to detect existing signals in the ISM band, such as Wi-Fi channels, and avoid them by negotiating a channel map between the communicating Bluetooth devices.

The USB 3.0 computer cable standard has been proven to generate significant amounts of electromagnetic interference that can interfere with any Bluetooth devices a user has connected to the same computer.

Wi-Fi

Wi-Fi is technology for radio wireless local area networking of devices based on the IEEE 802.11 standards. WiFi is a trademark of the Wi-Fi Alliance, which restricts the use of the term Wi-Fi Certified to products that successfully complete interoperability certification testing.

Devices that can use Wi-Fi technologies include desktops and laptops, video game consoles, smartphones and tablets, smart TVs, digital audio players, cars and modern printers. Wi-Fi compatible devices can connect to the Internet via a WLAN and a wireless access point. Such an access point (or hotspot) has a range of about  indoors and a greater range outdoors. Hotspot coverage can be as small as a single room with walls that block radio waves, or as large as many square kilometres achieved by using multiple overlapping access points.

Different versions of Wi-Fi exist, with different ranges, radio bands and speeds. Wi-Fi most commonly uses the  UHF and  SHF ISM radio bands; these bands are subdivided into multiple channels. Each channel can be time-shared by multiple networks. These wavelengths work best for line-of-sight. Many common materials absorb or reflect them, which further restricts range, but can tend to help minimise interference between different networks in crowded environments. At close range, some versions of Wi-Fi, running on suitable hardware, can achieve speeds of over 1 Gbit/s.

Anyone within range with a wireless network interface controller can attempt to access a network; because of this, Wi-Fi is more vulnerable to attack (called eavesdropping) than wired networks. Wi-Fi Protected Access (WPA) is a family of technologies created to protect information moving across Wi-Fi networks and includes solutions for personal and enterprise networks. Security features of WPA have included stronger protections and new security practices as the security landscape has changed over time.

To guarantee no interference in any circumstances the Wi-Fi protocol requires 16.25 (11b) or 22 MHz (11g/n) of channel separation (as shown below). Any remaining gap is used as a guard band to allow sufficient attenuation along the edge channels. This guardband is mainly used to accommodate older routers with modem chipsets prone to full channel occupancy, as most modern WiFi modems are not prone to excessive channel occupancy.

While overlapping frequencies can be configured and will usually work, it can cause interference resulting in slowdowns, sometimes severe, particularly in heavy use. Certain subsets of frequencies can be used simultaneously at any one location without interference (see diagrams for typical allocations):

However, the exact spacing required when the transmitters are not colocated depends on the protocol, the data rate selected, the distances and the electromagnetic environment where the equipment is used.

The attenuation by relative channel adds to that due to distance and the effects of obstacles. Per the standards, for transmitters on the same channel, transmitters must take turns to transmit if they can detect each other 3 dB above the noise floor (the thermal noise floor is around -101 dBm for 20 MHz channels). On the other hand, transmitters will ignore transmitters on other channels if the attenuated signal strength from them is below a threshold Pth which, for non Wi-Fi 6 systems, is between -76 and -80 dBm. While there can be interference (bit errors) at a receiver, this is usually small if the received signal is more than 20 dB above the attenuated signal strength from transmitters on the other channels.

The overall effect is that if there is considerable overlap between adjacent channels transmitters they will often interfere with each other. In general, using every fourth or fifth channel by leaving three or four channels clear between used channels causes much less interference than sharing channels, and narrower spacing still can be used at further distances.

Zigbee/IEEE 802.15.4 wireless data networks 
Many Zigbee/IEEE 802.15.4-based wireless data networks operate in the 2.4–2.4835 GHz band, and so are subject to interference from other devices operating in that same band. The definition is for 16 channels numbered 11–26 to occupy the space, each 2 MHz wide and spaced by 5 MHz. The F0 of channel 11 is set at 2.405 GHz. The DSSS scheme is used to spread out the spectrum (from a data-rate of 250 kbps) and reduce interference.

To avoid interference from IEEE 802.11 networks, an IEEE 802.15.4 network can be configured to only use channels 15, 20, 25, and 26, avoiding frequencies used by the commonly used IEEE 802.11 channels 1, 6, and 11. The exact channel selection depends on the local popular 802.11 channel. For example, in a place that uses 1, 7, and 13 channels, the preference would be for channels 15, 16, 21, and 22. Channel coexistence is possible provided 8 meters of spacing between the 802.11 access point and the 802.15.4 device.

RF peripherals
Some wireless peripherals like keyboards and mice use the 2.4 GHz band with a proprietary protocol.

Microwave oven

Microwave ovens operate by emitting a very high power signal in the 2.4 GHz band. Older devices have poor shielding, and often emit a very "dirty" signal over the entire 2.4 GHz band.

This can cause considerable difficulties to Wi-Fi and video  transmission, resulting in reduced range or complete blocking of the signal.

The IEEE 802.11 committee that developed the Wi-Fi specification conducted an extensive investigation into the interference potential of microwave ovens. A typical microwave oven uses a self-oscillating vacuum power tube called a magnetron and a high voltage power supply with a half wave rectifier (often with voltage doubling) and no DC filtering. This produces an RF pulse train with a duty cycle below 50% as the tube is completely off for half of every AC mains cycle: 8.33 ms in 60 Hz countries and 10 ms in 50 Hz countries.

This property gave rise to a Wi-Fi "microwave oven interference robustness" mode that segments larger data frames into fragments each small enough to fit into the oven's "off" periods.

The 802.11 committee also found that although the instantaneous frequency of a microwave oven magnetron varies widely over each half AC cycle with the instantaneous supply voltage, at any instant it is relatively coherent, i.e., it occupies only a narrow bandwidth. The 802.11a/g signal is inherently robust against such interference because it uses OFDM with error correction information interleaved across the carriers; as long as only a few carriers are wiped out by strong narrow band interference, the information in them can be regenerated by the error correcting code from the carriers that do get through.

Audio-visual (AV) Devices

Baby monitors

Some Baby monitors use the 2.4 GHz band. Some transmit only audio but others also provide video.

Audio Devices

Wireless Microphones

Wireless microphones operate as transmitters.  Some digital wireless microphones use the 2.4 GHz band (e.g. AKG model DPT 70).

Wireless Speakers

Wireless speakers operate as receivers. The transmitter is a preamplifier that may be integrated in another device. Some wireless speakers use the 2.4 GHz band, with a proprietary protocol. They may be subject to dropouts caused by interference from other devices.

Video devices

Video senders typically operate using an FM carrier to carry a video signal from one room to another (for example, satellite TV or closed-circuit television). These devices typically operate continuously but have low (10 mW) transmit power. However, some devices, especially wireless cameras, operate with (often unauthorized) high power levels, and have high-gain antennas.

Amateur Radio operators can transmit two-way Amateur television (and voice) in the 2.4 GHz band—and all ISM frequencies above 902 MHz—with maximum power of 1500 watts in the US if the transmission mode does not include spread spectrum techniques. Other power levels apply per regions. In the UK, the maximum power level for a full licence is 400 watts. In other countries, maximum power level for non-spread-spectrum emissions are set by local legislation. 
 
Although the transmitter of some video cameras appears to be fixed on one frequency, it has been found in several models that the cameras are actually frequency agile, and can have their frequency changed by disassembling the product and moving solder links or dip switches inside the camera.

These devices are prone to interference from other 2.4 GHz devices, due to the nature of an analog video signal showing up interference very easily. A carrier to noise ratio of some 20 dB is required to give a "clean" picture.

Continuous transmissions interfere with these, causing "patterning" on the picture, sometimes a dark or light shift, or complete blocking of the signal.

Non-continuous transmissions, such as Wi-Fi, cause horizontal noise bars to appear on the screen, and can cause "popping" or "clicking" to be heard in the audio.

Wi-Fi networks

Video senders are a big problem for Wi-Fi networks. Unlike Wi-Fi they operate continuously, and are typically only 10 MHz in bandwidth. This causes a very intense signal as viewed on a spectrum analyser, and completely obliterates over half a channel. The result of this, typically in a Wireless Internet service provider-type environment, is that clients (who cannot hear the video sender due to the "hidden node" effect) can hear the Wi-Fi without any issues, but the receiver on the WISP's access point is completely obliterated by the video sender, so is extremely deaf. Furthermore, due to the nature of video senders, they are not interfered with by Wi-Fi easily, since the receiver and transmitter are typically located very close together, so the capture effect is very high. Wi-Fi also has a very wide spectrum, so only typically 30% of the peak power of the Wi-Fi actually affects the video sender. Wi-Fi is not continuous transmit, so the Wi-Fi signal interferes only intermittently with the video sender. A combination of these factors - low power output of the Wi-Fi compared to the video sender, the fact that typically the video sender is far closer to the receiver than the Wi-Fi transmitter and the FM capture effect means that a video sender may cause problems to Wi-Fi over a wide area, but the Wi-Fi unit causes few problems to the video sender.

EIRP
Many video senders on the market in the UK advertise a 100 mW equivalent isotropically radiated power (EIRP). However, the UK market only permits a 10 mW EIRP limit. These devices cause far more interference across a far wider area, due to their excessive power. Furthermore, UK video senders are required to operate across a 20 MHz bandwidth (not to be confused with 20 MHz deviation). This means that some foreign imported video senders are not legal since they operate on a 15 MHz bandwidth or lower, which causes a higher spectral power density, increasing the interference. Furthermore, most other countries permit 100 mW EIRP for video senders, meaning a lot of video senders in the UK have excessive power outputs.

Radio Control

R/C Models
Many radio controlled drones, model aircraft, model boats and toys use the 2.4 GHz band.

Garage doors 
Some garage door openers use the 2.4 GHz band.

Car alarm

Certain car manufacturers use the 2.4 GHz frequency for their car alarm internal movement sensors. These devices transmit on 2.45 GHz (between channels 8 and 9) at a strength of 500 mW. Because of channel overlap, this will cause problems for channels 6 and 11, which are commonly used default channels for Wi-Fi connections. Because the signal is transmitted as a continuous tone, it causes particular problems for Wi-Fi traffic. This can be clearly seen with spectrum analysers. These devices, due to their short range and high power, are typically not susceptible to interference from other devices on the 2.4 GHz band.

Radars 
Some radars use the 2.4 GHz band.

Power

Smart Power Meters 
Some Smart Power Meters use the 2.4 GHz band.

Wireless Power 
Some new truly wireless power transmission uses the 2.4 GHz band.

Resolving interference

Normally interference is not too hard to find. Products are coming onto the market cheaply which act as spectrum analyzers and use a standard USB interface into a laptop, meaning that the interference source can be fairly easily found with a little work, a directional antenna and driving around to find the interference.

Use wires 
It is better to use Ethernet or maybe PLC when Wi-Fi can be avoided (but beware of power surges, they may happen through any conductive cable).

Band change
A general strategy for Wi-Fi is to only use the 5 GHz and 6 GHz bands for devices that also support it and to switch off the 2.4 GHz radios in the access points when this band is not needed anymore.

Channel change
Often solving interference is as simple as changing the channel of the offending device. Particularly with video senders, whereby plugging in the receiver with no transmitter attached will let you "see" the neighbour's video sender, this technique is considered part of the "Installation process". Where the channel of one system, such as a Wireless ISP cannot be changed, and it is being Interfered with by something such as a video sender, the owner of the video sender is normally very happy to assist with doing this, providing it is not too much work. However the problem comes when the interference is something such as a wireless CCTV camera which is mounted on a chimney and requires a long ladder to access. Such cameras, due to their height, cause serious problems across a wide area.

Alternative product
Another cure is to offer an alternative product to the owner free of charge. Typically this would be a wired camera, which normally have far better performance than wireless cameras anyway, a cable to replace the video sender, or an alternative video sender which has been hard-wired to an alternative channel, with no means of changing it back to the offending frequency.

Yet another cure is to move from 2.4 GHz to another frequency which lacks the vulnerability to interference inherent at that frequency, for example the 5 GHz frequency for 802.11a/n.

If a device using a proprietary protocol is causing or suffering interference, replacing it with another one using a different communication scheme (proprietary or standard) might solve the problem.

Parameter change
In extreme cases, where the interference is either deliberate or all attempts to get rid of the offending device have proved futile, it may be possible to look at changing the parameters of the network. Changing collinear antennas for high gain directional dishes normally works very well, since the narrow beam from a high gain dish will not physically "see" the interference. Often sector antennae have sharp "nulls" in their vertical pattern, so changing the tilt angle of sector antennas with a spectrum analyzer connected to monitor the strength of the interference can place the offending device within the null of the sector. High gain antennas on the transmitter end can "overpower" the interference, although their use may cause the effective radiated power (ERP) of the signal to become too high, and so their use may not be legal.

Adding base stations
Interference caused by a Wi-Fi network to its neighbors can be reduced by adding more base stations to that network. Every Wi-Fi standard provides for automatic adjustment of the data rate to channel conditions; poor links (usually those spanning greater distances) automatically operate at lower speeds. Deploying additional base stations around the coverage area of a network, particularly in existing areas of poor or no coverage, reduces the average distance between a wireless device and its nearest access point and increases the average speed. The same amount of data takes less time to send, reduces channel occupancy, and gives more idle time to neighboring networks, improving the performance of all networks concerned. However, there is a maximum number of base stations that can be added, after which they disrupt the network more than that they help: any additional capacity is then sapped by control traffic.

The alternative of increasing coverage by adding an RF power amplifier to a single base station can bring similar improvements to a wireless network. The additional power offered by a linear amplifier will increase the signal-to-noise ratio at the client device, increasing the data rates used and reducing time spent transmitting data. The improved link quality will also reduce the number of retransmissions due to packet loss, further reducing channel occupancy. However, care must be taken to use a highly linear amplifier in order to avoid adding excessive noise to the signal.

All of the base stations in a wireless network should be set to the same SSID (which must be unique to all other networks within range) and plugged into the same logical Ethernet segment (one or more hubs or switches directly connected without IP routers). Wireless clients then automatically select the strongest access point from all those with the specified SSID, handing off from one to another as their relative signal strengths change. On many hardware and software implementations, this hand off can result in a short disruption in data transmission while the client and the new base station establish a connection. This potential disruption should be factored in when designing a network for low-latency services such as VoIP.

See also
 Electromagnetic interference
 List of WLAN channels

References

Radio electronics